Madhurmau Kalan, sometimes written as Marhar Mau Kala, is a village in Gosainganj block of Lucknow district, Uttar Pradesh, India. As of 2011, its population is 2,047, in 377 households.

See also 
 Madhurmau Khurd

References 

Villages in Lucknow district